Barry Guy Hillier (8 April 1936 — 10 December 2016) was an English footballer who played as a left-back.

Career
In 1953, Hillier signed for Southampton, initially playing in the reserves. During Hillier's time in the reserves at the club, he was called up for National Service. Being stationed in Rhyl, Hillier played amateur football for Chester. On 14 September 1957, following his return to Southampton, Hillier made his debut for the club in a 5–0 win against Queens Park Rangers. In 1959, Hillier was released by Southampton, subsequently joining Southern League club Poole Town, managed by ex-Southampton full-back Mike Keeping.

Following a spell at Poole, Hillier played for Dorchester Town and Andover.

Personal life
Hiller's father, Joe, was a Welsh goalkeeper who played for Cardiff City and Middlesbrough.

References

1936 births
2010 deaths
Association football defenders
English footballers
People from Redcar
Southampton F.C. players
Chester City F.C. players
Poole Town F.C. players
Dorchester Town F.C. players
Andover F.C. players
English Football League players
Southern Football League players
English people of Welsh descent